Czech Miss Essence is a national beauty pageant in the Czech Republic. The pageant was founded in 2005, where the winners were sent to Miss Universe.

History

Czech Miss was established in 2005 and is organized and produced by Michaela Maláčová, Miss Czechoslovakia 1991 and director of Miss Marketing s.r.o. From 2005 to 2009, the pageant selected a winner to represent the country in Miss Universe, and a first runner up participated in the Miss Earth pageant. In 2010, Czech Miss and its rival pageant, Miss Czech Republic merged under the direction of Maláčová, and two winners were selected. The winner of Czech Miss 2010 competed in Miss Universe 2010 and Czech Miss World 2010 vied in Miss World 2010, while the first runner up competed in Miss Earth 2010 pageant.

Since 2011 the pageant has selected three winners: Czech Miss, Czech Miss World, and Czech Miss Earth to compete in Miss Universe, Miss World, and Miss Earth respectively. In 2015 Marcela Krplova became co-owner. After that previous runner up of Miss Czech republic Ivana Kubelkova became patron. In 2016 company was taken over by Martin Ditmar and Eva Ceresnakova. Since 2016 Ceska miss lost the license of Miss World to Miss Czech republic. In 2018 Ceresnakova sold her part in company to Miss Events a.s. and Juliette Armand. 

In 2012, Czech Miss pageant produced an international winner for the first time when Tereza Fajksová won Miss Earth 2012 in the Miss Earth pageant.

International crowns 
 One – Miss Earth winner: Tereza Fajksová (2012) 
 One – Miss Global winner: Karolína Kokešová (2019)

Titleholders

Titleholders under Česká Miss org.

Česká Miss 

From 1993 to 2004, the Czech Republic competed at the Miss Universe under the Miss České republiky organization which the winners represented the nation. In 2005, Michaela Maláčová established Czech Miss, whose winner then competed in the Miss Universe pageant. On occasion, when the winner does not qualify due to the age requirement, a runner-up is sent.

Česká Miss Earth 

The Czech Republic was first represented in Miss Earth in 2002 by Apolena Tůmová who was chosen by another organization. The Czech Republic was not represented in Miss Earth in 2001, 2003 and 2004. From 2005 to 2009, after Michaela Maláčová established Czech Miss, the runner-up of the pageant competed at the Miss Earth pageant. Since 2010, Czech Miss has selected three national winners, where the third winner is awarded the title of Czech Miss Earth and goes on to represent the Czech Republic in the Miss Earth pageant.

Past titleholders under Česká Miss org.

Česká Miss World

From 1993 to 2009, the Czech Republic competed at Miss World through the Miss České republiky organization. However, in 2010, after the pageant went bankrupt, Michaela Maláčová took over the Miss World franchise in the Czech Republic. The second placed of the Česká Miss was assigned to Miss World. In 2016 due to police investigation of previous owner Marcela Krplová, Miss World decided to stopped down cooperation with Czech Miss.

See also
 Miss Universe
 Miss World
 Miss International
 Miss Earth
 Muž Roku

References

External links
Official Česká Miss website

Czech Republic
Czech Republic
Recurring events established in 1993
2005 establishments in the Czech Republic
Czech awards